WNYO may refer to:

 WNYO (FM), a radio station (88.9 FM) licensed to Oswego, New York, United States
 WNYO-TV, a television station (channel 16, virtual 49) licensed to Buffalo, New York, United States

zh:编辑